Pompeiu's theorem is a result of plane geometry, discovered by the Romanian mathematician Dimitrie Pompeiu. The theorem is simple, but not classical. It states the following:

Given an equilateral triangle ABC in the plane, and a point P in the plane of the triangle ABC, the lengths PA, PB, and PC form the sides of a (maybe, degenerate) triangle.

The proof is quick. Consider a rotation of 60° about the point B.  Assume A maps to C, and P maps to P '. Then . Thus, triangle PCP ' has sides equal to PA, PB, and PC and the proof by construction is complete (see drawing).

Further investigations reveal that if P is not in the interior of the triangle, but rather on the circumcircle, then PA, PB, PC form a degenerate triangle, with the largest being equal to the sum of the others, this observation is also known as Van Schooten's theorem.

.
The symbol  △  denotes the area of the triangle whose sides have lengths PA, PB, PC.

Pompeiu published the theorem in 1936, however August Ferdinand Möbius had published a more general theorem about four points in the Euclidean plane already in 1852. In this paper Möbius also derived the statement of Pompeiu's theorem explicitly as a special case of his more general theorem. For this reason the theorem is also known as the Möbius-Pompeiu theorem.

External links
MathWorld's page on Pompeiu's Theorem
Pompeiu's theorem at cut-the-knot.org

Notes 

Elementary geometry
Theorems about equilateral triangles
Theorems about triangles and circles
Articles containing proofs